Wilhelm Martin Luther (27 November 1912 – 2 June 1962) was a German librarian, musicologist and director of the Göttingen State and University Library.

Life 
In 1936 he received his doctorate with a thesis on Gallus Dreßler in Göttingen. He completed his studies with a doctorate and state examination. He entered the academic library service in 1939; after his subject examination in 1941 at the Berlin State Library he worked at the Göttingen University Library.

Under  he was promoted to deputy director, and in 1958 he succeeded him in his office. Luther was particularly committed to the re-establishment of the German [interlibrary loan] after the end of the Second World War and to (central) cataloguing. Thus the "Central Catalogue of Foreign Literature" was maintained in Göttingen, which formed an important basis for interlibrary loan. He also founded the Niedersächsische Zentralkatalog, set up the Göttingen journal reference and pushed for a reworking of the Göttingen Schlagwortkatalog.

In addition to his work in the library, he was also active in teaching and published several articles on library science and librarianship. In 1959 he was appointed honorary professor in Göttingen, where he taught general bibliography and documentation, library science and history of science. For the second edition of the "Handbuch der Bibliothekswissenschaften" he revised the chapter on the use of libraries, together with Wilhelm Krabbe he wrote the "Lehrbuch der Bibliotheksverwaltung".

With Willi Kahl he published the Repertorium der Musikwissenschaft (Repertory of Musicology), an important location reference for music literature in German libraries. On the occasion of the 200th anniversary of the death of Johann Sebastian Bach he prepared the exhibition "Documenta", which was shown in Göttingen, Schaffhausen, Florence and Milan and attracted more than 20,000 visitors. Since 1961, Luther also served as director of the Johann-Sebastian-Bach-Institut in Göttingen.

(IFLA). In 1961 he was elected chairman of the VDB, but had to resign after only a few months due to a serious illness. Luther died on 2 June 1962, in Göttingen, at age 49.

Publications 
 Luther, Wilhelm M.: Gallus Dressler (1533 bis etwa 1589). Ein Beitrag zur Geschichte des protestantischen Schulkantorats im 16. Jahrhundert (Göttinger musikwissenschaftliche Arbeiten 1), Göttingen 1942, zugleich: Göttingen, Univ.-Diss.
 Luther, Wilhelm M. (edit.): Johann Sebastian Bach. Documenta, Kassel / Basel 1950.
 Luther, Wilhelm M. / Krabbe, Wilhelm: Lehrbuch der Bibliotheksverwaltung, Stuttgart 1953.
 Kahl, Willi / Luther, Wilhelm M. (edit.): Repertorium der Musikwissenschaft. Musikschrifttum, Denkmäler und Gesamtausgaben in Auswahl (1800–1950) mit Besitzvermerken deutscher Bibliotheken und musikwissenschaftlicher Institute, Kassel / Basel 1953.
 Luther, Wilhelm M.: Der internationale Leihverkehr. In Libri 7,2–3 (1957), doi:10.1515/libr.1958.7.1-4.97.
 Luther, Wilhelm M.: Die nicht-liturgischen Musikinkunabeln der Göttinger Bibliothek. In: Voigt, Christian (edit.): Libris et litteris. Festschrift für Hermann Tiemann zum 60. Geburtstag am 9. Juli 1959 (Veröffentlichung. Maximilian-Gesellschaft 75), Hamburg 1959, .
 Luther, Wilhelm M.: Die Bibliotheksbenutzung. In: Milkau, Fritz / Leyh, Georg (edit.): Handbuch der Bibliothekswissenschaft, 2nd edition. Wiesbaden 1961, .

References

Further reading 
 Bargheer, Margo / Ceynowa, Klaus (edit.): Tradition und Zukunft – die Niedersächische Staats- und Universitätsbibliothek Göttingen – eine Leistungsbilanz zum 65. Geburtstag von Elmar Mittler. Universitätsverlag Göttingen 2005, .
 Haberland, Alexandra / Klemmt, Rainer / Siefkes, Frauke: Lexikon deutscher wissenschaftlicher Bibliothekare 1925–1980 (Zeitschrift für Bibliothekswesen und Bibliographie. Sonderhefte 42), Frankfurt 1985, .
 Kind-Doerne, Christiane: Die niedersächsische Staats- und Universitätsbibliothek Göttingen. Ihre Bestände in Geschichte und Gegenwart. Mit einem Beitrag von Klaus Hahnel über die Handschriftenabteilung (Beiträge zum Buch- und Bibliothekswesen 22), Wiesbaden 1986, .
 Kittel, Peter: Professor Dr. Wilhelm Martin Luther. In: Zentralblatt für Bibliothekswesen 76 (1962), .
 Werhahn, Heinz M.: Luther, Martin Wilhelm. In: Corsten, Severin / Füssel, Stephan / Pflug, Günther et al. (edit.): Lexikon des gesamten Buchwesens (LGB2), vol. 4: Institut für Buch- und Handschriftenrestaurierung – Lyser, Stuttgart 2., completely reworked. 1995 edition, .

External links 
 

1912 births
1962 deaths
German librarians
20th-century German musicologists
Bach scholars
People from Hersfeld-Rotenburg